Tennessee's 33rd Senate district is one of 33 districts in the Tennessee Senate. It has been represented by Democrat London Lamar since 2022, following her appointment by the Shelby County Commission after Katrina Robinson was expelled by the Senate. By most measures, it is the most Democratic-leaning district in the state.

Geography
District 33 is based in South and Southwest Memphis, also covering small parts of Germantown, Collierville, and other Shelby County suburbs.

The district is located almost entirely within Tennessee's 9th congressional district, with a very small section extending into the 8th district. It overlaps with the 83rd, 84th, 85th, 87th, 91st, and 93rd districts of the Tennessee House of Representatives, and borders the state of Mississippi.

2018

2014

Federal and statewide results in District 33

References 

33
Shelby County, Tennessee